Chhatra Manikya (d. 1667) was the Maharaja of Tripura from 1661 to 1667.

Life
Born Nakshatra Roy, he was a younger son of Maharaja Kalyan Manikya. Following his father's defeat at the hands of the Mughal prince Shah Shuja in 1658, Nakshatra was sent as a hostage to the imperial court. While there, his charisma gained him the favour of the Mughal emperor.

After his father's death and the ascension of his brother Govinda Manikya, Nakshatra made a bid for the throne in 1661. With the backing of the emperor and the military support of the Mughal governor of Bengal, an attack was launched, with the capital Udaipur being captured on the first assault. Govinda was forced to leave the kingdom and Nakshatra ascended the throne under the name Chhatra Manikya.

After he had reigned six years, his brother returned and retook the throne, having used the aid of the neighbouring ruler of Arakan. It is uncertain whether Chhatra was killed by Govinda at this point, or if he had already died prior to the attack.

References

Kings of Tripura
History of Tripura
1667 deaths